London features a temperate oceanic climate (Cfb). This gives the city cool winters, warm summers with precipitation fairly evenly distributed all year round. London has a very rich history of meteorological observations, with precipitation records beginning as early as January 1697 at Kew Gardens. Irregular observations were made at multiple locations in the ensuing years. An observing station has been located at Greenwich since 1841, giving London its longest continuous reliable temperature series. Other stations include Heathrow, beginning in 1948, Hampstead, beginning in 1910, Northolt, beginning in 1948, and St James's Park, beginning in 1910.

The highest temperature ever observed in London is  provisionally recorded at both Heathrow Airport and St James's Park on 19 July 2022 and the lowest is  1 January 1962. The lowest daily maximum temperature is  occurring on 3 occasions: 8 January 1841, 4 January 1867 and 12 January 1987. This is also the highest minimum temperature ever reported anywhere in the United Kingdom. In addition to this, London holds multiple national records, including the record maximum for the months of February, April, May and June.

The city can sometimes experience extremes. Snowfall is an infrequent occurrence in winter, falling on an average of 16 days per year, though infrequently heavy. Thunderstorms are a similarly occurring feature, occurring on average up to 16 days per year. London rarely experiences tornadoes, although an F2 struck Kensal Green on 7 December 2006.

London is vulnerable to climate change in the United Kingdom, and there is increasing concern among hydrological experts that London households may run out of water before 2050.

In January 2023, London Mayor Sadiq Khan issued a "very high" air-pollution alert and urged citizens to avoid unnecessary car journeys as the city grappled with high levels of pollution, according to AQI website, which stated that london's air quality index stood at 58, considered moderate.

Classifications

Climate data tables

London Weather Centre

St James's Park - Weather Station near the centre of London

Heathrow - Airport Weather Station in the suburbs of West London

Kew Gardens - Weather Station in South West London on the banks of the River Thames

Hampstead - Weather Station in North London
The weather station enclosure is the most elevated of any in the London area, and as a result daytime temperatures are typically one degree lower than Heathrow, Kew, Northolt and Greenwich.

Northolt - Airfield Weather Station in the North West of London

Greenwich - Weather Station in South East London near the river Thames

Average UV index

See also
River Thames frost fairs
Climate of the United Kingdom

Notes

References

External links
BBC Weather - Forecast for London
Met Office - Forecast for London

Climate
Climate of England
Climate by city